"Dreams" is a song by British singer and songwriter Gabrielle. It was written by Gabrielle and Tim Laws and produced by Richie Fermie for her debut studio album, Find Your Way (1993). Originally, the song included a sample of the song "Fast Car" by Tracy Chapman, but because of copyright reasons the sample had to be removed. Released as Gabrielle's debut single, "Dreams" entered the UK Singles Chart at number two, which was the highest chart entry a debut act had scored in the United Kingdom at that time. before reaching number one for three weeks in June 1993. The song also peaked at number 26 on the Billboard Hot 100 chart in the United States while peaking at number-one on Billboards Hot Dance Club Play chart.

"Dreams" is widely seen as Gabrielle's signature song and its lyrics inspired as the title of her greatest hits compilation Dreams Can Come True, Greatest Hits Vol. 1 (2001). The song was later sampled by the More Fire Crew on their 2002 single "Dreams" and is featured heavily in the 1999 Paul Thomas Anderson film Magnolia, where William H. Macy's downtrodden character Donnie Smith plays the song repeatedly as a motivational aid. In 2013, Gabrielle re-recorded the track with producer Naughty Boy for her compilation album Now and Always: 20 Years of Dreaming.

Background and release

Gabrielle used to perform at a London club called Moonlighting. One night after she'd performed Luther Vandross covers at the club, a woman told her, "This is as good as it's going to get for you." Disheartened by this, the singer went home and wrote the first lines of "Dreams" in her diary. Shortly after, Gabrielle and another singer, Jackie King from the club, got an opportunity to make a record in a studio in Byfleet, Surrey. Her boyfriend had paid for them to do it. Producer Tim Laws was impressed by her voice and asked if she could come back later on her own. The singer then performed the lyrics of "Dreams" over Laws' music which was a backing track, using a Korg M1 synthesiser for most of the parts – piano, bass, string line – with an Akai S900 firing off drum loops and hits. The first version became a hit in nightclubs, being played by underground DJs. This was the version that featured the "Fast Car" sample by Tracy Chapman, released on 12" vinyl in 1991. After selling a few thousand copies, Gabrielle got signed to the Go! Beat label. Due to the use of the "Fast Car" sample not being cleared, a producer named Richie Fermie rerecorded a new version of "Dreams", without the sample. This version went straight to number two on the UK Singles Chart as the highest charting debut single ever, before hitting number-one.

Critical reception
Larry Flick from Billboard described the song as a "gloriously romantic, uplifting pop/dance shuffler" with a "wildly infectious chorus, delivered with a sly, feline grace." He commented further that a "interplay of contrasting elements like acoustic strumming, hip-hop-styled beats, and disco strings works surprisingly well". Tom Ewing of Freaky Trigger noted Gabrielle's voice as "soaked in personality" and complimented the production as "reassuringly professional, very close to the kind of powerpoint soul the Lighthouse Family would serve up later in the 90s." Dave Sholin from the Gavin Report felt that the singer's "warm vocal style is just right to complement the hook-laden melody that she co-wrote." A reviewer from Irish Independent called it a "smooth debut pop single". Knight Ridder described it as "hypnotic". In his weekly UK chart commentary, James Masterton wrote that this is "another one of those records that is a hit almost before it even started." He also described it as a "haunting dreamy ballad" and "a unique record".

Pan-European magazine Music & Media viewed it as "immaculate". Alan Jones from Music Week said about the original 1992 release, that "the soothing and gentle guitar intro to Tracy Chapman's "Fast Car" underpins this superbly soulful dance cut, written and performed by a 22-year-old newcomer from Sydenham. Chiming synth strings and a Soul II Soul shuffle propel it along nicely, the uncluttered arrangement and production (by Unit 3) allowing her fine vocals room to breathe." He added, "Initially on a limited pressing of 1,500, which have now sold out, this is already getting specialist radio play, and could very easily explode as a major pop hit, given adequate distribution." Another editor, Andy Beevers called the 1993 version "excellent". Marts Andrups from the RM Dance Update declared it as "a stunning debut with "summer hit" written all over it. Like a funky Tracy Chapman, there's a beautiful soul vocal over a deceptively simple acoustic guitar and string arrangement." Sian Pattenden from Smash Hits gave "Dreams" four out of five, writing, "If you're a big girl and like soulful swishdance music, this'll be in your in-car CD player for 1,000 years. More of less. You've got to have dreams, she reckons, and it's true, children."

Chart performance
In Europe, the song reached number one in the United Kingdom on 20 June 1993 and stayed there for three weeks. Before, it had entered the chart at number two. At that time, it was the highest chart entry a debut female solo act had scored in the UK. It was a top-five hit in Ireland, Italy, Portugal and Sweden and a top-10 hit in Austria, Belgium, Denmark, Finland, Iceland, the Netherlands and Switzerland. On the Eurochart Hot 100, "Dreams" reached its best position as number six on 14 August. Outside Europe, the single peaked at number one on the US Billboard Dance Club Songs chart on 23 October, and the Canadian RPM Dance/Urban chart. In 1993, Dreams had sold 513,000 copies in United Kingdom.

Music video
The accompanying music video for "Dreams" was directed by British photographer, artist and singer Kate Garner. It received heavy rotation on MTV Europe and was later published by Vevo on YouTube in September 2013. As of December 2022, the video had generated more than 16 million views.

Track listings

Charts

Weekly charts

Year-end charts

Certifications

Other versions
 In 2013, Gabrielle herself re-recorded the track with producer Naughty Boy. It can be found on her album Now and Always: 20 Years of Dreaming.
 In 2017, UK producer Alex Ross released a cover, featuring vocals by Dakota and a rap verse from T-Pain.

References

1991 songs
1993 debut singles
Gabrielle (singer) songs
Go! Beat singles
London Records singles
Music Week number-one dance singles
Songs about dreams
Songs written by Gabrielle (singer)
UK Singles Chart number-one singles